The Parliament of the Democratic Socialist Republic of Sri Lanka (Sinhala: ශ්‍රී ලංකා පාර්ලිමේන්තුව Shri Lanka Parlimenthuwa, Tamil: இலங்கை நாடாளுமன்றம் Ilaṅkai nāṭāḷumaṉṟam) is the supreme legislative body of Sri Lanka. It alone possesses legislative supremacy and thereby ultimate power over all other political bodies in the island. It is modeled after the British Parliament.

It consists of 225 members known as Members of Parliament (MPs). Members are elected by proportional representation for five-year terms, with universal suffrage.

The President of Sri Lanka has the power to summon, suspend, prorogue, or terminate a legislative session and to dissolve the Parliament. President can dissolve Parliament only after the lapse of  years or if  majority of Members of Parliament requests him. The actions of the president to either suspend or dissolve the Parliament is subject to legal scrutiny of the Supreme Court of Sri Lanka. The Speaker or, in his absence, the Deputy Speaker and Chairman of Committees or the Deputy Chairman of Committees, presides over Parliament.

Powers
Parliament has the power to make laws, including laws having retrospective effect and repealing or amending any provision of the Constitution, or adding any provision to the Constitution.

History

The first legislature established in Ceylon was the Executive Council and the legislative council, which were established on 13 March 1833 according to the recommendations of the Colebrook-Cameron commission. The Executive Council was composed of the Colonial Secretary, the officer commanding the Military Forces, the Attorney General, the Auditor-General and the Treasurer. The duties of the council were advisory and the Governor of Ceylon, who presided over their meetings and consulted them, was at liberty to disregard their advice. At first it was made up of only British officials but later included native citizens. At the beginning 16, and later 49 members, were elected for the legislative council, but a limited number of people were qualified to vote.

In 1931 the Legislative Council was dissolved and in its place a more powerful State Council of Ceylon was established with its 101 members elected by universal adult franchise as provided by the Donoughmore Constitution.

Prior to the granting of independence and the establishment of the Dominion of Ceylon on 4 February 1948, a new bicameral parliament was established in 1947, according to the recommendations of the Soulbury Commission after the State Council was dissolved. It was based on the Westminster model with an upper house, the Senate, whose members were appointed and a lower house of parliament, the House of Representatives, whose members were directly elected. The House of Representatives consisted of 101 Members (increased to 157 in 1960) and the Senate consisted of 30 Members, of whom 15 were elected by the House of Representatives and 15 nominated by the Governor-General of Ceylon.

The Senate was abolished on 2 October 1971.  On 22 May 1972 when the republican constitution was enacted, the House of Representatives was replaced with the National State Assembly which had 168 elected members. This itself was replaced by the Parliament of Sri Lanka when the constitution of the Democratic Socialist Republic of Sri Lanka was enacted in 1977.

In 1987, a grenade was lobbed into a conference room inside the Parliament complex where government MPs were meeting. Two people were killed and sixteen injured, but the target of the attack, President J. R. Jayawardene escaped unhurt. The Janatha Vimukthi Peramuna claimed responsibility for the attack.

On 20 August 2015, Two major parties the United National Party and Sri Lanka Freedom Party have signed Memorandum of Understanding to form the National Government in order to address major unresolved issue after the end of 30-year old ethnic conflict, This is the first time in Sri Lanka's political history that two major parties agrees to work in the joint government. The Presidential Secretariat announced that the Government will be functioning as joint (national unity) government comprising two major parties. United National Party leader who won the most seats was appointed Prime Minister

Members and elections

Of the 225 members, 196 are elected from 22 electoral districts, which are multi-member. The remaining 29 MPs are elected from National Lists allocated to the parties (and independent groups) in proportion to their share of the national vote.

Qualifications
Any Sri Lankan citizen may be elected to parliament unless disqualified to do so under the Article 90 of the Constitution, which includes;
 President of the Republic,
 Public officer, judicial officer or an officer of a public corporation, 
 Member of the Regular Force of the Army, Navy or Air Force; with the exception of holders of the rank of Field Marshal, 
 A police officer or a public officer exercising police function,
 Declared as an undischarged bankrupt or insolvent in terms of the applicable law,
 A person stands nominated as a candidate for more than one electoral district or as a candidate for more than one political party or group for the same district,
 A person who is also a citizen of any other country,
 A person adjudged guilty by a competent court or by a Special Presidential Commission of Inquiry.

Officers
When Parliament first meets after a general election, it will elect three members to serve as the Speaker, Deputy Speaker and Chairman of Committees (known simply as the Deputy Speaker) and the Deputy Chairman of Committees. Whilst presiding, the Speaker or Deputy Speaker wears ceremonial dress.

Parliament Secretariat
The Parliament Secretariat, headed by the Secretary General of Parliament, is in charge of all its administrative duties. Until 1972, the post was known as Clerk of Parliament.  The Secretary General is appointed by the President, subject to the approval of the Constitutional Council. The Sergeant-at-Arms is responsible for the maintenance of law, order, and security on the House's premises and acts also as master-of-ceremonies. The Serjeant-at-Arms carries the ceremonial mace, a symbol of the authority of the People and of the Parliament, into the House each day in front of the Speaker, and the Mace is laid upon the Table of the House during sittings. Currently, the parliament secretariat administration is divided into nine departments.

These departments are:
 Department of Serjeant-at-Arms
 Department of Administration
 Hansard Department
 Department of the Co-ordinating Engineer
 Department of Catering and Housekeeping
 Department of Information Systems and Management
 Department of Legislative Services
 Department of Finance & Supplies
 Department of Communication
The Staff Advisory Committee (SAC) established under the Parliamentary Staff Act provides advice and guidance to the Parliamentary Secretariat with respect to matters concerning Parliamentary staff. The SAC consists of the Speaker (Chairman), the Leader of the House, the Minister of Finance and the Leader of the Opposition. Secretariat maintains the Speaker's Residence and the Madiwela Housing Complex for MPs and the nineteen-roomed holiday bungalow for MPs, General's House in Nuwara Eliya. Parliament also owns Mumtaz Mahal which was the former residence of the Speaker and Srawasthi Mandiraya the former hostel for MPs. These are now used by other government entities.

Parliament buildings

Under the British Colonial government, when the Executive Council and the legislative councils were set up in 1833, they met in a building opposite Gordon Gardens, which is now the "Republic Building", occupied by the Ministry of Foreign Affairs. On 29 January 1930 the British Governor of Ceylon, Sir Herbert Stanley (1927–1931), opened a building fronting the ocean at Galle Face, Colombo, designed for meetings of the Legislative Council. It was subsequently used by the State Council (1931–1947), the House of Representatives (1947–1972), the National State Assembly (1972–1977) and the Parliament of Sri Lanka (1977–1981). Today the Old Parliament Building is used by the Presidential Secretariat.

In 1967 under Speaker Albert F. Peris, the leaders of the political parties unanimously resolved that a new Parliament building be constructed on the opposite side of Beira Lake from the existing Parliament at Galle Face, but no further action was taken. While Stanley Tillekeratne was the Speaker (1970–77), the leaders of the political parties entrusted the drawing up of plans for a new Parliament building to architects, but the project was subsequently abandoned.

The island was where the palace of the King Vikramabahu III's powerful Minister Nissaka Alakesvara had been situated. It had belonged to E. W. Perera prior to being vested in the state.

The building was designed by architect Deshamanya Geoffrey Bawa and built with Sri Lankan funds. On 29 April 1982, the new Parliamentary Complex was declared open by President J.R. Jayewardene.

Current layout

See also
 Committee On Public Enterprises (Sri Lanka)
 Politics of Sri Lanka
 List of legislatures by country

References

External links
 

 
Government of Sri Lanka
Sri Lanka